Levi ben Abisha ben Phinhas ben Yitzhaq; (1920–May 23, 2001), served as the Samaritan High Priest from 1998 until his death.  In his secular work prior to his retirement, he was chief clerk in the Nablus bus company.  Before and after his retirement from secular work he was a genial and well-known teacher.  He was the first Samaritan high priest to visit the United States.  He petitioned the Israeli Supreme Court to grant Samaritan priests equality in law with rabbis; the petition was still pending at the time of his death.  He lived in Nablus in the West Bank and is buried in the cemetery of Kiryat Luza on Mount Gerizim.  He was succeeded as high priest by his second cousin Saloum Cohen.

Sources
 The (London) Independent, 4 June 2001.

1920 births
2001 deaths
Samaritan high priests
People from Nablus